Howard Township is a civil township of Cass County in the U.S. state of Michigan. The population was 6,207 at the 2010 census.

Geography
Howard Township is located in southwestern Cass County, bordered by Berrien County and the city of Niles to the west. Barron Lake, near the center of the township, is the largest body of water.

Demographics
As of the census of 2000, there were 6,309 people, 2,472 households, and 1,846 families residing in the township. The racial makeup of the township was 93.87% White, 3.71% African American, 0.41% Native American, 0.17% Asian, 0.03% Pacific Islander, 0.59% from other races, and 1.22% from two or more races. Hispanic or Latino of any race were 0.97% of the population.

There were 2,472 households, out of which 28.9% had children under the age of 18 living with them, 62.1% were married couples living together, 8.3% had a female householder with no husband present, and 25.3% were non-families. 21.3% of all households were made up of individuals, and 8.5% had someone living alone who was 65 years of age or older.  The average household size was 2.55 and the average family size was 2.92.

In the township the population was spread out, with 23.0% under the age of 18, 6.3% from 18 to 24, 27.4% from 25 to 44, 29.5% from 45 to 64, and 13.9% who were 65 years of age or older.  The median age was 41 years. For every 100 females, there were 102.0 males.  For every 100 females age 18 and over, there were 100.2 males.

The median income for a household in the township was $41,477, and the median income for a family was $47,382. Males had a median income of $36,098 versus $23,780 for females. The per capita income for the township was $19,429.  About 4.6% of families and 7.0% of the population were below the poverty line, including 9.2% of those under age 18 and 7.3% of those age 65 or over.

References

External links
Howard Township official website

Townships in Cass County, Michigan
South Bend – Mishawaka metropolitan area
Townships in Michigan